The Institute for Affordable Transportation (IAT) is a non-profit organization located in Indianapolis, Indiana, USA.  The IAT is devoted to developing high-quality, low-cost transportation to provide mobility, freedom and economic hope to people in rural areas of developing countries. This involves a class of transportation known as a Basic Utility Vehicle (BUV).  BUV's are designed to provide mobility, freedom and economic hope to people in rural areas of developing countries.  The BUV can promote trade and sustainable development by allowing micro-business growth and trade at a grassroots level.

In order to engage young engineering and technology talent, the IAT has enlisted educational institutions in the design and development of BUV's.  Other universities are involved with the IAT initiative in marketing research to calculate costs, target market, distribution, location, service and logistics issues.

Will Austin, the Executive Director of IAT, began working full-time on the BUV design in April 2000 and founded the Institute for Affordable Transportation as a 501(c)(3) public charity shortly thereafter.  IAT is funded by individuals, foundations, churches, and international corporations.

See also
 Basic Utility Vehicle
 Student Design Competition

External links

References
http://mywebtimes.com/archives/ottawa/display.php?id=262605
http://www.accessmylibrary.com/coms2/summary_0286-13323636_ITM
http://www.accessmylibrary.com/coms2/summary_0286-25961065_ITM

Sustainable transport